Tracy Seretean is an American filmmaker who directed and co-produced Big Mama (2000), which won the Academy Award for Documentary Short Subject. She also produced The Third Monday in October (2006).

See also
Big Mama (film)
The Third Monday in October

References

American documentary filmmakers
Living people
Year of birth missing (living people)